Otar Turashvili (born 14 July 1986) is a Georgian-born Romanian rugby union player. He plays primarily as a hooker and occasionally as a prop for professional SuperLiga club București and București-based European Challenge Cup side the Wolves. Turashvili also plays for Romania's national team the Oaks.

References

External links

 
 
 
 Otar Turashvili at US Colomiers

1986 births
Living people
Rugby union players from Tbilisi
Romanian rugby union players
Romania international rugby union players
Rugby union players from Georgia (country)
Georgian emigrants to Romania
București Wolves players
CSM București (rugby union) players
US Colomiers players
Rugby union hookers